Liolaemus poconchilensis is a species of lizard in the family Iguanidae.  It is from Chile and Peru.

References

poconchilensis
Lizards of South America
Reptiles of Chile
Reptiles of Peru
Reptiles described in 2004